Fatiha Ouali (born 25 October 1974 in Roubaix, Nord) is a female race walker from France.

Biography 

She won eleven titres French national walking titles, seven on the road.

She held the record of France on track for the 5000m walk (21:51.70) and of the 10000m walk (44:58.60), set in 2001, and that of the 3000m Indoors walk (12:40.44, 2002).

Prize list 
French Athletic Championships :
 10 km walk : winner in 2000, 2001, 2002, 2003 and 2005
 20 km walk : winner  in 2000 and 2002
French Indoor Athletic Championships :
3,000m walk : winner in 2000, 2002, 2003 and 2005

Records

Achievements

References
 

1974 births
Living people
French female racewalkers
Athletes (track and field) at the 2000 Summer Olympics
Olympic athletes of France
Sportspeople from Roubaix
French sportspeople of Algerian descent